The Great Mosque of Aleppo (Jāmi‘ Ḥalab al-Kabīr) is the largest and one of the oldest mosques in the city of Aleppo, Syria. It is located in al-Jalloum district of the Ancient City of Aleppo, a World Heritage Site, near the entrance to Al-Madina Souq. The mosque is purportedly home to the remains of Zechariah, the father of John the Baptist, both of whom are revered in Islam and Christianity. It was built in the beginning of the 8th century CE. However, the current building dates back to the 11th through 14th centuries. The minaret in the mosque was built in 1090, and was destroyed during fighting in the Syrian Civil War in April 2013.

History

Founding
The site of the Great Mosque was once the agora of the Hellenistic period, which later became the garden for the Cathedral of Saint Helena during the Christian era of Roman rule in Syria.

The mosque was built on land that formerly was used as the Cathedral cemetery. The church itself was left and the area became a sacred place for both religions. According to later traditions, the construction of the earliest mosque on the site was commenced by the Umayyad caliph al-Walid I in 715 and was finished by his successor Sulayman ibn Abd al-Malik in 717. Architectural historian K. A. C. Creswell has attributed its construction solely to the latter, quoting 13th century Aleppine historian Ibn al-Adim who wrote Sulayman's intent was "to make it equal to the work of his brother al-Walid in the Great Mosque at Damascus". Another tradition claims al-Walid founded the mosque using materials from the so-called "Church of Cyrrus".

However, architectural historian Jere L. Bacharach noted that the most likely patron of the mosque was Maslamah ibn Abd al-Malik, a brother of al-Walid and Sulayman who was the governor of the local province (Jund Qinnasrin) sometime prior to 710 until at least the early period of Sulayman's rule. Accordingly, this would explain the belief that the mosque's construction took place during the reign of both caliphs. Moreover, Maslamah's governorship of Qinnasrin was largely ignored by the early Arabic historians, who focused their attention on his campaigns against the Byzantine Empire and the Armenians, and his governorship over the provinces of Iraq, Iranian Azerbaijan, Upper Mesopotamia and Armenia. Bacharach further states that Maslamah's commissioning of a large congregational mosque in Aleppo, a major base from which to attack the Byzantines, would have "been appropriate, if not necessary".

Renovation
In the second half of the 11th century, the Mirdasids controlled Aleppo and built a single-domed fountain in the mosque's courtyard. At the northwest corner of the mosque, the 45-meter high minaret was built by the Shia Muslim qadi ("chief Islamic judge") of Aleppo, Abu'l Hasan Muhammad in 1090, during the reign of Seljuk governor Aq Sunqur al-Hajib. Its construction was finished in 1094 during Tutush's rule. The architect of the project was Hasan ibn Mufarraj al-Sarmini.
The mosque was restored and expanded by the Zengid sultan Nur al-Din in 1159 after a great fire that had destroyed the earlier Umayyad structure; In 1260, the mosque was razed by the Mongols. In 1281, the mosque was burned again by the Mongols, and the minbar was taken by the Armenians of Sis, according to Al-Mufaddal.

The Mamluks (1260–1516) made repairs and alterations. Carved Kufic and naskhi inscriptions decorated the entire minaret along with alternate bands of stylized ornaments in patterns and muqarnas. Sultan Qalawun replaced the burnt out mihrab (niche indicating the qibla, or direction to Mecca) in 1285. Later, Sultan al-Nasir Muhammad (1293–1341) had the new minbar ("preacher's pulpit") constructed during his reign.

The courtyard and minaret of the mosque were renovated in 2003.

Syrian Civil War

On 13 October 2012 the mosque was seriously damaged during clashes between the armed groups of the Free Syrian Army and the Syrian Army forces. President Bashar al-Assad issued a presidential decree to form a committee to repair the mosque by the end of 2013.

On the 24th of April, 2013, the minaret of the mosque was reduced to rubble during an exchange of heavy weapons fire between government forces and rebels during the ongoing Syrian civil war. The Syrian Arab News Agency (SANA) reported that members of Jabhat al-Nusra detonated explosives inside the minaret, while opposition activists said that the minaret was destroyed by Syrian Army tank fire as part of an offensive. Countering assertions by the state media of Jabhat al-Nusra's involvement, opposition sources described them as rebels from the Tawhid Brigades who were fighting government forces around the mosque. The opposition's main political bloc, the Syrian National Coalition (SNC), condemned the minaret's destruction, calling it "an indelible disgrace" and "a crime against human civilization". Syrians have begun rebuilding and restoring the site, with some meager international assistance.

Architecture

Courtyard
The Great Mosque contains a number of architectural similarities to the Great Mosque of Damascus, including a hypostyle plan with large marbled courtyard surrounded by porticoes. The vast courtyard connects to different areas of the mosque, positioned behind the colonnaded arcade. The courtyard is well known for its alternating black and white stone floor that forms intricate geometric arrangements. Two ablutions fountains, both of which are roofed. The courtyard also has an open prayer estrade and a sundial.

Interior

The ḥaram ("sanctuary") consists of the main prayer hall to the courtyard's south, which contains the primary elements of the mosque: the shrine of Zechariah, a 15th-century minbar ("pulpit"), and an elaborately carved miḥrâb ("niche"). Although the central entrance contains an inscription attributing its construction to Ottoman sultan Murad III, it was built by the Mamluks. The hall has three naves, all lined with 18 quadrangular columns with cross-vaults. This large prayer hall originally had a basic straight rooftop with a central qubbah (dome, but during Mamluk rule was replaced with an intricate cross-vaulted system with arches and a small dome over the arcades. The mihrab is deep and round and Zechariah's supposed tomb is to its left along the southern wall.

There are three other halls that abut the remaining sides of the courtyard. The eastern and northern halls each have two naves, while the western hall has one. The latter is mostly of modern construction. The east hall dates to the period of Malik Shah (1072–92) and the north hall was renovated during Mamluk sultan Barquq's reign (1382–1399), but largely maintained its original 11th century character.

Minaret
The minaret's shaft, which protruded out of the flat roof of one of the halls, consisted of five levels with a crowning top encircled with a veranda. A muqarnas-style cornice divided the veranda top from the shaft. The structure was largely built of fine ashlar. The minaret was heavily decorated in relief ornament, more so than any other Islamic-era structure in Aleppo with the exception of the Shu'aybiyah Madrasa. Its stories contained cusped arches and continuous mouldings. The masonry of the minaret varied throughout, with a mix of light and heavy usage of toothed tools, short, long, vertical and horizontal strokes, fine and rough finishes, and small and large stones.

According to E.J. Brill's First Encyclopaedia of Islam, the minaret was "quite unique in the whole of Muslim architecture". Archaeologist Ernst Herzfeld described the architectural style of the minaret as being "the product of Mediterranean civilization," writing that its four facades carried elements of Gothic architecture. Meanwhile, anthropologist Yasser Tabbaa stated the mosque was a continuation of the ancient North Syrian churches and "an entirely localized phenomenon, centered mainly in the region between Aleppo and Edessa".

Maqsurah
The Great Mosque has a small museum annexed to it containing a number of ancient manuscripts. Similar to the Great Mosque of Damascus, a maqsurah was built in the form of a square domed room raised by one step above the floor level of the prayer hall, and adorned with Kashan tiles that cover all the internal surfaces of its walls. A large arched gate supported by two robust columns and topped with capitals as well as a bronze door screen comprise the entranceways to the maqsurah. The tomb containing the remains of Prophet Zakariah, decorated with silver embroideries containing Quranic verses from the chapter of Mariyam, was located in the center of the room. The museum's number of valuable objects, including a box purportedly containing a strand of the Prophet Muhammad's hair, were subject to looting during the Syrian War in the 2013 clash. However, rebels claimed they had instead salvaged ancient handwritten Koranic manuscripts and hidden them.

Gallery

See also
 Citadel of Aleppo
 List of heritage sites damaged during the Syrian civil war
 Religious significance of the Syrian region
 Umayyad Mosque

Notes

References

Bibliography

External links

 Photo of damage taken from the Facebook page of Le patrimoine archéologique syrien en danger
 Photo of damage  taken from the Facebook page of Le patrimoine archéologique syrien en danger
 Photo of damage  taken from the Facebook page of Le patrimoine archéologique syrien en danger
 Photo of damage  taken from the Facebook page of Le patrimoine archéologique syrien en danger
 Photo of damage taken from the Facebook page of Le patrimoine archéologique syrien en danger
 Great Mosque of Aleppo on YouTube

710s establishments
8th-century mosques
Umayyad architecture in Syria
Mosques in Aleppo
Mosques converted from churches